Britta Madelein Svensson (born 20 July 1969) is a  retired race walker from Sweden. She won the silver medal in the women's 10 km Walk at the 1991 World Championships in Tokyo, Japan and represented her native country at the 1992 Summer Olympics in Barcelona, Spain, where she ended up in sixth place in the women's 10 km Walk event.

Achievements

References

Profile

1969 births
Living people
Swedish female racewalkers
Athletes (track and field) at the 1992 Summer Olympics
Olympic athletes of Sweden
World Athletics Championships medalists
Sportspeople from Västernorrland County
People from Sollefteå Municipality